Tunç Fındık (born 1972, Ankara) is a Turkish professional climber, mountaineer, mountain guide, author, and motivational speaker.

Life 

He is the first Turkish climber who climbed Mount Everest twice and from different routes. He summited many mountains in Turkey and abroad including eight-thousanders.

He climbed his 13th eight-thousanders in 2019 for his project of 14×8000.
 Mount Everest (8848 m) in 2001, Second climb north ridge route in 2007
 Cho Oyu (8201 m) in 2005
 Lhotse (8516 m) in 2006
 Dhaulagiri (8167 m) in 2009
 Makalu (8462 m) in 2010
 Kangchenjunga (8586 m) in 2011 
 K2 (8611 m) in 2012
 Shishapangma (8027 m) in 2013
 Manaslu (8163 m) in 2013
 Gasherbrum II (8035 m) in 2014
 Broad Peak (8047 m) in 2017
 Annapurna (8091 m) in 2019
 Gasherbrum I (8068 m) in 2019

Books 
 Kaçkar-Verçenik Tırmanış Rehberi   'Alter Yayınları' 
 Tanrıların Tahtına Yolculuk-  Everest Tırmanışımın Hikâyesi  'Alter Yayınları'
 Karakurum'da 80 gün  'Geven Yayınları'
 Aladağlar'da 50 Rota  'Geven Yayınları'
 Kış Dağcılığı / Teknikler ve Taktikler  'AKUT Yayınları'
 50 Climbing routes in the Aladag 'Geven Yayınları'
 Aladaglar haritası 1:25.000 ölçekli 'Geven Yayınları'
 İrtifa 8000- Yüksek Macera 'Tunç Fındık Yayınları'
 K2 Dağların Dağı 'Tunç Fındık Yayınları'
 Altitude 8000  'Tunç Fındık Yayınları'

Documentary
 K2 Mountain of Mountains (2014)

See also
 List of Mount Everest summiters by number of times to the summit

References

External links 
 Tunç Fındık Official Website
 Üç Soru Üç Cevap - Tunç Fındık'la Yeni Kitabı Üzerine
 Tunç Fındık'la 14X8000 projesi üzerine
 UIAA Tunç Fındık Haberi
 K2 Mountain of Mountain (2014) Documentary
 Skylife Röportajı Zirvedeki Türk: Tunç Fındık

1972 births
People from Ankara
Turkish mountain climbers
Turkish summiters of Mount Everest
Living people
Bilkent University alumni